Preminchukundam Raa ( Come, let's love)  is a 1997 Indian Telugu-language romantic action film directed by Jayanth C. Paranjee and produced by D. Suresh Babu under Suresh Productions. The film stars Venkatesh and Anjala Zaveri with music composed Mahesh Mahadevan. The plot follows a couple's love entangled in a region plagued by violence.

Preminchukundam Raa is considered to be one of the first films to portray the factionalism in the Rayalaseema region of Andhra Pradesh state. Released on 9 May 1997, the film was blockbuster and became the highest grossing Telugu film of that year.

Plot
Veerabhadraiah is a powerful factionist in Rayalaseema who is against love marriages. Sivudu his henchman; whose word is an ordinance to him. Sivudu says yes to Veerabhadraiah's every deed, even when he kills his father front of him. Reddappa a savage is the main opponent of Veerabhadraiah and both of them maintain bloodshed rivalry.

Parallelly, Giri a valor student at Hyderabad leads a merry life. Once he disputes with his colleagues, due to their threat his parents send him to Kurnool to his elder sister Vaani's residence where he falls for a beauty Kaveri neighbors to Giri's brother-in-law Chakrapani. Meanwhile, Giri's parents fix his engagement which he breaks-up and backs to Kurnool.  starts hating him. Being incognizant of it, Kaveri shows abhorrence on him, but later realizes his true love.

Here as a flabbergast, Kaveri is daughter of Veerabhadraiah who is aware of the love affair and resents. Now, Giri reacts on Veerabhadraiah and takes Kaveri along with him. Veerabhadraiah sends his goons along with Sivudu in their chase. Giri and Kaveri reach Hyderabad, his parents reject their love because they are afraid of Veerabhadraiah, even SRK Master also curses them. Hence, Giri leaves the house and with his friends' help, makes their marriage arrangements. At the same time, Sivudu attacks them in which Giri is injured, Kaveri is separated and Sivudu forcibly taken her back to Rayalaseema.

Simultaneously, Chakrapani and Vaani arrive at Hyderabad who shots Giri and admits him in the hospital. At present, Giri's parents decide to talk to Veerabhadraiah and moves to Rayalaseema, whom he lock down. Immediately, Giri rushes to Rayalaseema where rescues Sivudu and his family from Reddappa. Therein, his words reforms Sivudu. At last, Giri protects his parents and proceeds along with Kaveri. In the chase while Veerabhadraiah is about to knock them, Sivudu obstructs his way and declares him as wrong, which makes him realize. Finally, Giri and Kaveri marry each other.

Cast

Soundtrack

Music is composed by Mahesh Mahadevan, along with Mani Sharma. Mahadevan is credited for music but Sharma has composed three songs, "Meghale Thankundi", "Pellikala Vachesindhe", and "O Panaipothundi Babu." "Pellikala Vachesindhe" was inspired from Yé ké yé ké, the 1987 international hit song by Guinean musician Mory Kanté. Music was released by Aditya Music.

Reception
Preminchukundam Raa was the first Telugu film to run 100 days in more than 50 centres and it ran for 50 days in 57 centres.

Notes

References

External links
 

1997 films
1990s Telugu-language films
Indian romantic comedy-drama films
1997 romantic comedy-drama films
Films directed by Jayanth C. Paranjee
Suresh Productions films